Lake Mary Jane is located north of the city of Sebring, Florida. It is a man-made lake, being dredged from a swamp. The lake is privately owned, in fact being entirely within the Bluffs of Sebring, a condominium development. Lake Mary Jane is closed to the public, existing for the enjoyment of the condo residents and their visitors. Condos almost completely surround the lake, which is about a half mile long and a block wide.

The lake is mainly for decorative purposes and has four fountains.  It has a dock and is surrounded by a sidewalk.  The lake and the entire condominium complex are surrounded by Casablanca Drive.

References

Mary Jane
Mary Jane